Leitzaldea is a comarca in Navarre, Spain.

Municipalities
The comarca consists of eight municipalities, with the largest being the municipality of Leitza. They are listed below with their populations at recent censuses, together with the most recent official estimate:

The municipalities of Arano and Goizueta lie in the north of the comarca, at a distance from the rest of the municipalities.

References 

Comarcas of Navarre